The Snite Museum of Art is the fine art museum on the University of Notre Dame campus, near South Bend, Indiana. With about 30,000 works of art that span cultures, eras, and media, the Snite Museum's permanent collection serves as a rich resource for audiences on campus and beyond. Through programs, lectures, workshops, and exhibitions, the museum supports faculty teaching and research and provides valuable cultural opportunities for students and visitors. Students play an active role in programming in their capacities as gallery guides and as student advisory members.

History 

The Bishops Gallery and Museum of Indian Antiquities established about 1875 in the Main Building, preceded the current Snite Museum building which was constructed in 1980. By 1924, the Wightman Memorial Art Gallery had opened in Bond Hall. In 1952, O'Shaughnessy Hall, home of the Notre Dame College of Arts and Letters, included exhibition galleries.  During the 1950s, Croatian sculptor Ivan Meštrović was in residence at the University, working in the eponymous Meštrović Studio.

In 1975, the Fred B. Snite family donated funds to construct the Snite Museum of Art.  The museum opened in 1980, incorporating both Meštrović's sculpture studio (Snite is also home to the Ivan Meštrović papers) and the O'Shaughnessy art gallery, the latter used for the presentation of traveling and temporary exhibitions.

Museum Building and Future Expansion 

The museum opened in the fall of 1980, consolidating the adjacent O'Shaughnessy Hall Galleries and the studio of sculptor Ivan Meštrović with the new structure. The 70,000 square-foot building, designed by Ambrose Richardson, A.I.A., was a gift of the Snite Family in memory of Frederick Jr. '33. 

With the donation in 2018 of funds from lead benefactors Ernestine Raclin and her daughter and son-in-law Carmen and Chris Murphy, plans are underway for the construction of a 132,000 square foot complex to be built in two phases on the south edge of campus. The first phase of the Raclin Murphy Museum of Art is anticipated to be approximately 70,000 square feet and will house the museum galleries and other functions. In 2019, the University hired the leading classical design firm Robert A.M. Stern Architects (RAMSA), as the architects of the new museum. As a prominent element of a growing arts district, the Raclin Murphy Museum of Art will be situated in a location easily accessible for both on- and off-campus patrons. Construction began April 2020, with completion anticipated in November 2023.

Collection and Strengths

The Snite's holdings are particularly strong in prints, photography, French 18th- and 19th painting, Baroque period paintings, decorative arts, African art, Olmec and Mesoamerican art, Native American art, and 20th-century art. The museum has been the fortunate recipient of exceptional holdings from donors, gifts responsible for many of the museum's strongest collections. These collections include the Jack and Alfrieda Feddersen Collection of Rembrandt Etchings; the Noah L. and Muriel S. Butkin Collection of 19th-Century French Art; the John D. Reilly Collection of Old Master and 19th-Century Drawings, the Janos Scholz Collection of 19th-Century European Photographs; the Mr. and Mrs. Russell G. Ashbaugh Jr. Collection of Meštrović Sculpture and Drawings; the George Rickey Sculpture Archive; and the Virginia A. Martin Collection of 18th-Century Decorative Arts.

The Snite holds paintings by artists such as Taddeo di Bartolo, Bernardino Luini, Memling, Francesco de Mura, Fiammingo, Corot, Gustave Colin, Walter Sickert, and Georgia O'Keeffe. It has late medieval paintings with devotional subject matter by Gentile da Fabriano (Master of Adoration of the Magi altarpiece, Minias of Florence, and Neroccio di Bartolomeo de' Landi. It has baroque period paintings by Ativeduto Grammatica, Francesco Trevisani, Francesco Vanni, Claude Lorrain, Simon Vouet, Nicolaes Maes, Jan Lievens, Jacobus Storck ("Port Scene"), and Isaack Luttichuys, Lubin Baugin. Its 18th-century collection includes paintings by François Boucher, Jean François de Troy, Carle Van Loo, and the American Benjamin West. It also has 19th-century paintings by Léon Cogniet ("View of Tivoli"), Gustave Courbet, Thomas Couture, Charles-François Daubigny, Jean-Léon Gérôme (Study for Picador), Alphonse Legros, Georges Michel, and Alexandre-Hyacinthe Dunouy. Americans represented with paintings at this art museum include Diego Lasansky, Marsden Hartley, Mauricio Lasansky, Milton Avery, Ralston Crawford, and Irish-born Sean Scully. 20th century painters also represented include Paula Modersohn-Becker (Tree), Natalia Goncharova (Spring), Joan Miró, Joaquín Torres García, Georgia O'Keeffe (Blue One), Philip Pearlstein, Otto Dix, and Josef Albers. There are also sculptures by Ivan Meštrović (Ashbaugh Madonna).

Sculpture park 
A private donation by Charles S. Hayes made possible the creation of a unique public space for reflection, contemplation, and enjoyment of nature and art. Reopened in 2017, the Charles B. Hayes Family Sculpture Park was designed by noted American landscape architect Michael Van Valkenburgh on an eight-acre site at the south edge of the Notre Dame campus. A part of the Snite's permanent collection, the twelve sculptures in the park are by important national and international artists, including Wing Generator by Richard Hunt.

Outreach programs
Throughout the year, the Museum provides curriculum-related tours for 7,000 area-school children; after-school and summer programs at the Robinson Community Learning Center; summer art camps for at-risk children; art instruction for student teachers; and workshops for local K-12 instructors.

Notes

External links 

 

University of Notre Dame buildings and structures
University museums in Indiana
Art museums and galleries in Indiana
Museums in St. Joseph County, Indiana
Mesoamerican art museums in the United States
Art museums established in 1980
1980 establishments in Indiana
University and college buildings completed in 1980